NGC 1803 is a barred spiral galaxy located in the constellation of Pictor at an approximate distance of 192.48 million light years. NGC 1803 was discovered in 1834 by John Herschel.

See also
Galaxy

References

External links

NGC 1803 on SIMBAD

1803
Barred spiral galaxies
Pictor (constellation)
016715